Lindqvist is a surname of Swedish origin. It means 'linden twig', as lind means 'linden tree' (Tilia cordata), and kvist means 'twig'.

In Sweden, about 23,000 people have this surname in some variation. Lindqvist is by far the most common spelling (69%), but frequent variations include Lindkvist (20%) and Lindquist (11%). Rare variations include Lindhqvist (0.09%), Lindqwist (0.07%) and Lindkuist (0.01%).

Geographical distribution
As of 2014, 73.8% of all known bearers of the surname Lindqvist (with this exact spelling) were residents of Sweden (frequency 1:608), 20.2% of Finland (1:1,240), 1.6% of Norway (1:1,075,153) and 1.4% of Denmark (1:17,976).

In Sweden, the frequency of the surname was higher than national average (1:608) in the following counties:
 1. Västerbotten County (1:363)
 2. Gotland County (1:424)
 3. Gävleborg County (1:477)
 4. Norrbotten County (1:495)
 5. Blekinge County (1:515)
 6. Uppsala County (1:530)
 7. Dalarna County (1:553)
 8. Södermanland County (1:554)
 9. Kronoberg County (1:558)
 10. Stockholm County (1:562)
 11. Västernorrland County (1:584)
 12. Jönköping County (1:599)

In Finland, the frequency of the surname was higher than national average (1:1,240) in the following regions:
 1. Åland (1:221)
 2. Uusimaa (1:673)
 3. Ostrobothnia (1:743)
 4. Southwest Finland (1:880)
 5. Päijänne Tavastia (1:1,026)

People
 Anders Lindquist, Swedish mathematician
 Carl-Johan Lindqvist, Swedish luger who competed in the early 1990s 
 Catarina Lindqvist, Swedish professional tennis player
 Cecilia Lindqvist (1932–2021), Swedish Sinologist
 Ebba Lindqvist (1908-1995), Swedish writer and poet  
 Elin Lindqvist (born 1982), Swedish novelist
 Einar Lindqvist (1895–1972), Swedish ice hockey player who competed in the 1920 Summer Olympics
 Emma Lindqvist, Swedish handballer
 Erik Lindqvist (1886–1934), Swedish sailor who competed in the 1912 Summer Olympics
 Frans Wilhelm Lindqvist(1862–1931), Swedish inventor 
 Hélène Lindqvist, Swedish-born soprano
 Herman Lindqvist (politician), Swedish Social Democratic politician 
 Herman Lindqvist (journalist), Swedish journalist
 Jenny Lindqvist, Swedish ice hockey player
 Johan Anton Lindqvist, theatre director 
 John Ajvide Lindqvist, Swedish novelist and short stories author 
 Robin Lindqvist, professional Swedish ice hockey center
 Sven Lindqvist (1932–2019), Swedish author
 Sven Lindqvist (footballer) (1903–1987), Swedish soccer player who competed in the 1924 Summer Olympics

Science
 Fåhræus–Lindqvist effect, an effect where the viscosity of a fluid, namely blood, changes

See also
 Lindquist (disambiguation)

References

Swedish-language surnames